Phùng Công Minh is a Vietnamese footballer who plays for Vietnamese V-League club Becamex Bình Dương.

Honours

Club

Bình Dương F.C.
V-League: 2007, 2008
Vietnamese Super Cup: 2007, 2008

External links
 

1985 births
Living people
Vietnamese footballers
Vietnam international footballers
2007 AFC Asian Cup players
Becamex Binh Duong FC players
V.League 1 players
Association football midfielders